The Women's Cycle Racing Association (WCRA) was a British organisation which sought to further the cause of women in cycling.

History
Founded by Eileen Gray in 1949 under the name Women's Track Racing Association, it was eventually renamed the Women's Cycle Racing Association in 1956. The same year it organised the first British National Road Race Championships for women, which was won by Millie Robinson. There were no World Championship or Olympic events held for women at that time, but due to the work of the WCRA, a women's World Championships was first held in 1958, although it wasn't until 1984 that women were granted Olympic cycling events.

In 2007, after 50 years of campaigning, the Association was brought to an end having considered to have achieved the goals of the founding members.

Bibliography

References

1949 establishments in the United Kingdom
2007 disestablishments in the United Kingdom
Cycle racing in the United Kingdom
Cycling organisations in the United Kingdom
Cycle racing organizations
Sports organizations established in 1949
Organizations disestablished in 2007
Women's cycle racing